Curveulima macrophtalmica is a species of sea snail, a marine gastropod mollusk in the family Eulimidae.

Description
The shell measures approximately 5 mm.

Distribution
This species occurs in the following locations:

 European waters (ERMS scope)
 United Kingdom Exclusive Economic Zone

References

External links
 To World Register of Marine Species

Eulimidae
Gastropods described in 1972